Christopher Grant is an American media executive who is currently the CEO of Electus.

Electus is a full-service production studio that creates, produces and sells domestically and internationally a broad range of entertainment and branded content – scripted and unscripted – to broadcast, cable and digital/OTT platforms around the world. Through Electus International, the company's distribution business, Grant oversees the sale of more than 4,000 hours of content sold to over 220 countries, and is responsible for overseeing the company's continued growth across global and domestic TV, digital and branded entertainment.

William Morris Agency 
Grant began his career in the mailroom at William Morris Agency and later supported Ben Silverman, which prompted his move from New York to Los Angeles to help Silverman launch Reveille in 2002.

Reveille 
Grant was managing director of independent studio Reveille where he oversaw international distribution and creative affairs, and was responsible for distributing all of Universal Television Group's formats overseas. The company was best known for such popular, award-winning series as The Biggest Loser, The Office, The Tudors and Ugly Betty.

Shine International 
Reveille was sold to Elisabeth Murdoch's company Shine in 2008 to which Grant transitioned and helped to launch and run Shine International (now Endemol Shine), the global sales and distribution label responsible for distributing programming from the Shine Group companies including Reveille, Kudos, Dragonfly, Princess Productions, Brown Eyed Boy, Shine TV, Shine France, Shine Germany and Shine Australia as well as Metronome, the Nordic region's leading production group. Under his leadership, Shine International became one of the world's top television distributors, with Grant transforming into global brands such formats as MasterChef, The Biggest Loser, Are You Smarter than a Fifth Grader? and The Moment of Truth.

Electus 
Grant became CEO of Electus in 2011, overseeing a roster of such advertiser-supported series as, Running Wild with Bear Grylls (NBC & Nat Geo), The Toy Box (ABC), Wrong Man (Starz), Food Fighters (NBC), Get Out Alive (NBC), You vs. Wild (NETFLIX), Bet on Your Baby (ABC), Terry Crews Saves Christmas (The CW). Other Electus credits include Bear Grylls: Face the Wild (Facebook Watch), House of DVF (E!), Marco Polo (Starz), Dog and Beth: On the Hunt (CMT) Southern Justice (Nat Geo), Jane the Virgin (The CW), Flaked (Netflix), Darkness (Discovery) and Winsanity (GSN). Grant was nominated for an Emmy for Netflix You vs. Wild in 2019 and Nat Geo's Running Wild in 2021.

Also under the Electus banner are companies Artists First (fka Principato Young Entertainment), Big Breakfast (Adam Ruins Everything for truTV) and Notional (the acclaimed Chopped franchise for Food). Under Grant's supervision, Electus has struck several strategic investment deals with companies like Hudsun Media, Authentic Talent & Literary Management, and Rio Bravo.

Grant has led the company in developing business models that team prolific brands and commerce partners – including Walmart, Procter & Gamble, Mattel, Toys “R” Us, H&M, Saks Fifth Avenue, and Macy's – to create global formats with universal appeal such as with ABC series The Toy Box, as well as NBC's Fashion Star and Running Wild with Bear Grylls, among others.

In October 2018, Electus was acquired by content-creation and distribution company Propagate, founded by Ben Silverman and Howard Owens – with financing from The Raine Group – a deal through which the companies will develop and produce entertainment and branded content for nearly every platform and genre, both domestically and internationally.

Personal life 
A graduate of Carnegie Mellon University in Pittsburgh, Grant married Jenet Marie Ricketts in May 2012 and lives in Los Angeles, California with their two children. Grant was born and raised in New York, before moving to Los Angeles in 2002 to help start Reveille.

Recognition and affiliations 
Grant was named one of Adweek's 20 Under 40 in 2013, has been profiled in The Hollywood Reporter’s Executive Suite and was named one of The Hollywood Reporter’s Top 30 Reality Players of 2015. Grant also served as Co-Chair of the NATPE Board of Directors and is a former member of the International Academy of Television Arts & Sciences.

Credits

References

External links
 

American reality television producers
Carnegie Mellon University alumni
Place of birth missing (living people)
Year of birth missing (living people)
American television producers
American chief executives
Living people